Get Started is a David Lindgren album and song

Get Started may also refer to:
Get Started, Monkey Majik EP
Get Started, Queensrÿche EP
"Get Started", a Paul McCartney song from Egypt Station
Get Started (Windows), a tutorial for using Microsoft Windows